Gaston Furrer (born May 10, 1945 in Staldenried, Switzerland) is a former Swiss ice hockey player who played for the Switzerland men's national ice hockey team at the 1964 and 1972 Olympics.

External links

1945 births
HC La Chaux-de-Fonds players
Swiss ice hockey forwards
Olympic ice hockey players of Switzerland
Living people
Ice hockey players at the 1972 Winter Olympics
Ice hockey players at the 1964 Winter Olympics